Anabaseine (3,4,5,6-tetrahydro-2,3′-bipyridine) is an alkaloid toxin produced by Nemertines and Aphaenogaster ants. It is structurally similar to nicotine and anabasine. Similarly, it has been shown to act as an agonist on most nicotinic acetylcholine receptors in the central nervous system and peripheral nervous system.

Mechanism of action
The iminium form of anabaseine binds to most nicotinic acetylcholine receptors in both the peripheral nervous system and central nervous system. But, there is a higher binding affinity for receptors in the brain with a α7 subunit, as well as skeletal muscle receptors. Binding causes the depolarization of neurons, and induces the release of both dopamine and norepinephrine.

Biological effects
Anabaseine causes paralysis in crustaceans and insects, but not in vertebrates, presumably by acting as an agonist on peripheral neuromuscular nicotinic acetylcholine receptors.

Structure
The anabaseine molecule consists of a non-aromatic tetrahydropyridine ring connected to the 3rd carbon of a 3-pyridyl ring. It can exist in three forms at physiological pH:  a ketone, imine, or iminium structure. Due to conjugation between the imine and 3-pyridyl ring, anabaseine exists as a nearly coplanar molecule.

Synthesis
Spath and Mamoli first synthesized anabaseine in 1936. The researchers reacted benzoic anhydride with δ-valerolactam to yield N-benzoylpiperidone. Then, N-benzoylpiperidone is reacted with nicotinic acid ethyl ester to produce α-nicotinoyl-N-benzoyl-2-piperidone. This product then is decarboxylated, undergoes a ring closure, and amide hydrolysis to form anabaseine.

Additional synthetic strategies have since been developed by Bloom, Zoltewicz, Smith, and Villemin.

Derivatives
Due to anabaseine’s fairly non-specific binding to nicotinic acetylcholine receptors, the molecule was largely discarded as a useful tool in research or medicine. However, anabaseine derivatives have been identified with a more selective α7 binding profile. One such derivative (GTS-21, 3-(2,4-dimethoxybenzylidene)-anabaseine) has been studied as a drug candidate for cognitive and memory deficits, particularly associated with schizophrenia; it has been studied in phase II clinical trials without progression to phase III. Moreover, the modification of the anabaseine pyridine nucleus led to the obtainment of new derivatives endowed with binding and functional selectivity for the α3β4 nicotinic acetylcholine receptor subtype.

References

Neuropharmacology
Nicotinic agonists
Pyridine alkaloids
Drug discovery
3-Pyridyl compounds